Herbert Jude Score (June 7, 1933 – November 11, 2008) was an American Major League Baseball (MLB) player and announcer. Score pitched for the Cleveland Indians from 1955 through 1959 and the Chicago White Sox from 1960 through 1962. He was the American League (AL) Rookie of the Year in 1955, and an AL All-Star in 1955 and 1956. Due to an on-field injury that occurred in 1957, he retired early as a player in 1962. Score was a television and radio broadcaster for the Cleveland Indians from 1964 through 1997. He was inducted into the Cleveland Indians Hall of Fame in 2006.

Early life
Herb Score was born in Rosedale, New York, in 1933. At 3, he was run over by a truck and later had rheumatic fever. As a teenager, he started playing basketball and baseball at Holy Name of Mary School until he moved with his family to Lake Worth, Florida. In 1952, he threw six no-hitters for the Lake Worth Community High School baseball team, when the school won its only state baseball championship.

On June 7, 1952 (his 19th birthday), he signed a baseball contract with the Cleveland Indians. He was sent to Indianapolis of the American Association where he made 10 pitching starts. In 1953, he moved to Cleveland's Class A affiliate, Reading (Pennsylvania) of the Eastern League. At Reading, he became a roommate and lifetime friend with Rocky Colavito, a near future Cleveland Indians home run hitter and right fielder from the Bronx, New York. For the 1954 season, both were promoted to Triple-A Indianapolis. Score won The Sporting News Minor League Player of the Year Award and began to be referred to as "left-handed Bob Feller".

MLB playing career

Cleveland Indians (1955–1959)
In , Score came up to the major leagues (with Colavito) as a rookie with the Cleveland Indians at the age of 21. He quickly became one of the top power pitchers in the American League, no small feat on a team that still included Feller, Bob Lemon and other top pitchers, going 16–10 with a 2.85 earned run average in his first year. He appeared on the cover of Sports Illustrated magazine on May 30, 1955. Score struck out 245 batters in 1955, a major league rookie record that stood until , when it was topped by Dwight Gooden (Score, Gooden, Grover Cleveland Alexander, Don Sutton, Gary Nolan, Kerry Wood, Mark Langston, and Hideo Nomo were the only eight rookie pitchers to top 200 strikeouts in the 20th century). It was the first time in major league history that a regular starting pitcher averaged over one strikeout per inning.

Injury from Gil McDougald's line drive
On May 7, during the first inning of a night game against the New York Yankees at Municipal Stadium in Cleveland, Score threw a low fastball to Gil McDougald with Jim Hegan catching. McDougald lined the pitch to the mound and struck Score in the face, breaking Score's facial bones and injuring his eye. The ball caromed to third baseman Al Smith, who threw McDougald out before he rushed to the pitching mound to aid Score. McDougald, seeing Score hit by the baseball and then lying down and injured, also ran immediately to the pitching mound, instead of first base, to help Score. McDougald reportedly vowed to retire if Score permanently lost his sight in one eye as a result of the accident. Score eventually recovered his 20/20 vision, though he missed the rest of the season.

He returned early in the  season. Though many believe he feared being hit by another batted ball, and thus changed his pitching motion, Score rejected that theory. Score would tell Cleveland sportswriter Terry Pluto (for The Curse of Rocky Colavito) that, in 1958, after pitching and winning a few games and feeling better than he'd felt in a long time, he tore a tendon in his arm while pitching on a damp night against the Washington Senators and sat out the rest of the season.

In 1959, he shifted his pitching motion in a bid to avoid another, similar injury. "The reason my motion changed", Score told Pluto, "was because I hurt my elbow, and I overcompensated for it and ended up with some bad habits." As a result of the changes Score made in his pitching delivery, his velocity dropped and he incurred further injuries. Score pitched the full  season, going 9–11 with a 4.71 earned run average and 147 strikeouts.

In the book The Greatest Team Of All Time (Bob Adams, Inc, publisher. 1994), Mickey Mantle  picked Score as the toughest American League left-handed pitcher he faced (before the injury). Yogi Berra picked Score for his "Greatest Team Of All Time".

Chicago White Sox (1960–1962)
Score was traded to the Chicago White Sox by Cleveland on April 18, 1960 for pitcher Barry Latman. Score's roommate, Colavito, was traded to the Detroit Tigers the previous day. Score was reunited on the Chicago team with some former Indians players and manager Al Lopez. Score pitched parts of the following three seasons before retiring. He finished with a major league career record of 55–46, a 3.36 earned run average, and 837 strikeouts over eight seasons in 858 innings pitched.

Broadcasting career
Score retired from playing baseball in 1962. Score was revered by the Indians fans for his announcing style, including a low voice and a low-key style, as well as a habit of occasionally mispronouncing the names of players on opposing teams. Score's final Major League Baseball game as an announcer was Game 7 of the 1997 World Series.

Retirement and death
On October 8, 1998, while driving to Florida after being inducted into the Broadcasters Hall of Fame the night before, Score was severely injured in a traffic accident. He pulled into the path of a westbound tractor-trailer truck near New Philadelphia, Ohio, and his car was struck in the passenger side.  He suffered trauma to his brain, chest, and lungs. The orbital bone around one of his eyes was fractured, as were three ribs and his sternum. He spent over a month in the intensive care unit, and was released from MetroHealth Hospital in mid-December. He was cited for failure to stop at a stop sign.

He went through a difficult recovery, but managed to throw out the first pitch at the Indians' Opening Day on April 12, 1999. He suffered a stroke in 2002, and died on November 11, 2008, at his home in Rocky River, Ohio, after a lengthy illness. He is interred at Lakewood Park Cemetery in Rocky River. The Indians wore a memorial patch on their uniform during the 2009 season to honor him.

Awards and honors

Baseball

High school
 1952 Florida State Baseball Championship (Lake Worth Community High School)

Professional
 International League Most Valuable Player Award – 1954
 Sporting News Minor League Player of the Year – 1954
 American League Rookie of the Year – 1955
 Two-time American League All-Star – 1955, 1956
 Cleveland Guardians Hall of Fame – 2006
 Greater Cleveland Sports Hall of Fame (class of 1992)

Broadcasting
 Cleveland Association of Broadcasters Hall of Fame (class of 1996) 
 Cleveland Press Club Journalism Hall of Fame (class of 1998)
 Ohio Broadcasters Hall of Fame (class of 1998)

See also
  List of Major League Baseball annual strikeout leaders

References

External links

 
 New York Times Obituary
 Obituary in Cleveland Plain Dealer
 Herb Score – Sports Illustrated, May 30, 1955 (cover)
 Herb Score Chronology in This Day at Baseball

1933 births
2008 deaths
American League All-Stars
Major League Baseball Rookie of the Year Award winners
American League strikeout champions
Chicago White Sox players
Cleveland Indians announcers
Cleveland Indians players
Indianapolis Indians players
San Diego Padres (minor league) players
Major League Baseball pitchers
Major League Baseball broadcasters
Reading Indians players
Sportspeople from Queens, New York
Baseball players from New York City
People from Lake Worth Beach, Florida
American Association (1902–1997) MVP Award winners
Burials at Lakewood Park Cemetery
People from Rosedale, Queens
Baseball players from Cleveland